HDMS Tulugaq [Du-lou-ack] (Kalaallisut: Winter Raven) was a Royal Danish Navy  which until 21 December 2017 was stationed in Greenland. On 
22 December 2017, she was sold by an internet auction into private ownership.

References 
 

Agdlek-class cutters
Ships built in Svendborg
1978 ships